The 2014–15 Liga Premier de Ascenso season was split in two tournaments Apertura and Clausura. Liga Premier was the third-tier football league of Mexico. The season was played between 22 August 2014 and 16 May 2015.

Torneo Apertura

Changes from the previous season 
27 teams participated in this tournament.
Bravos de Nuevo Laredo moved to Soledad de Graciano Sánchez and changed its name to Santos de Soledad.
Unión de Curtidores moved to Tuxtla Gutiérrez and changed its name to Atlético Chiapas.
Deportivo de Los Altos moved to Ciudad Nezahualcóyotl and changed its name to Toros Neza.
Linces de Tlaxcala moved to Acapulco and became Internacional de Acapulco.
Tlaxcala F.C. was a new team created from the registration of Águilas Reales de Zacatecas and the Pachuca's Third Division team.
Cruz Azul Jasso changed its name to Cruz Azul Hidalgo.
Irapuato F.C., Vaqueros de Ameca, Delfines del Carmen "B" and Patriotas de Córdoba disappeared.
Due to creation of Mineros de Zacatecas, Estudiantes Tecos "B"  became the main team of the franchise. Also, Águilas Reales ceased to exist and gave its registration to a new club.
Atlético Coatzacoalcos remains in this division, pending certification to participate in the Ascenso MX.
Cachorros UdeG became the Leones Negros U-20 team, so they abandoned the Liga Premier de Ascenso.
Teca UTN moved to Huixquilucan.
Coras de Tepic became a reserve team of the Ascenso MX club.

Group 1

Group 2 
{{Location map+ |Mexico |width=500|float=right |caption=Location of teams in the 2014-15 LPA Group 2 |places=

Regular season

Group 1

Standings 

Last updated on November 16, 2014.Source: SoccerWay

Results

Group 2

Standings 

Last updated on November 16, 2014.Source: SoccerWay

Results

Regular-season statistics

Top goalscorers 
Players sorted first by goals scored, then by last name.

Source:

Liguilla

Liguilla de Ascenso (Promotion Playoffs) 
The four best teams of each group play two games against each other on a home-and-away basis. The higher seeded teams play on their home field during the second leg. The winner of each match up is determined by aggregate score. In the quarterfinals and semifinals, if the two teams are tied on aggregate the higher seeded team advances. In the final, if the two teams are tied after both legs, the match goes to extra time and, if necessary, a penalty shoot-out.

(t.p.) The team was classified by its best position in the general table

Quarter-finals

First leg

Second leg

Semi-finals

First leg

Second leg

Final

First leg

Second leg

Liguilla de Copa 
The Copa de la Segunda División (Second Division Cup) was a tournament created for those teams that had no chance to play the Liguilla de Ascenso. In each of the leagues the regular season is disputed for each tournament, the first eight (four of each group) advance to their respective league to determine the champion of the league, the next four of each group accessed the cup liguilla. If a team had no right to promotion, or was a reserve could not play promotion playoffs, so if he was in higher positions directly access the Cup, and gave way to teams that could rise.

Torneo Clausura

Changes from the previous tournament
Internacional de Acapulco changed the venue of its home matches to Estadio Mariano Matamoros on Xochitepec, Morelos. The club had to leave Acapulco due to the social and political situation lived in the State of Guerrero

Regular season

Group 1

Standings 

Last updated on April 12, 2015.Source: SoccerWay

Results

Group 2

Standings 

Last updated on April 12, 2015.Source: SoccerWay

Results

Regular-season statistics

Top goalscorers 
Players sorted first by goals scored, then by last name.

Source: Liga Premier

Liguilla

Liguilla de Ascenso (Promotion Playoffs) 
The four best teams of each group play two games against each other on a home-and-away basis. The higher seeded teams play on their home field during the second leg. The winner of each match up is determined by aggregate score. In the quarterfinals and semifinals, if the two teams are tied on aggregate the higher seeded team advances. In the final, if the two teams are tied after both legs, the match goes to extra time and, if necessary, a penalty shoot-out.

(t.p.) The team was classified by its best position in the general table

Quarter-finals

First leg

Second leg

Semi-finals

First leg

Second leg

Final

First leg

Second leg

Liguilla de Copa 

(t.p.) The team was classified by its best position in the general table

Relegation Table 

Last updated: 12 April 2015 Source: Liga Premier FMFP = Position; G = Games played; Pts = Points; Pts/G = Ratio of points to games played

Promotion Final 
The Promotion Final is a series of matches played by the champions of the tournaments Apertura and Clausura, the game is played to determine the winning team of the promotion to Ascenso MX. 
The first leg was played on 13 May 2015, and the second leg was played on 16 May 2015.

First leg

Second leg

See also 
2014–15 Liga MX season
2014–15 Ascenso MX season
2014–15 Liga de Nuevos Talentos season

References

External links 
 Official website of Liga Premier
 Magazine page 

 
1